Kemerovsky District is an administrative district (raion), one of the nineteen in Kemerovo Oblast, Russia. As a municipal division, it is incorporated as Kemerovsky Municipal District. It is located in the northern central portion of the oblast. Its administrative center is the city of Kemerovo (which is not administratively a part of the district). Population:  39,036 (2002 Census);

Geography
Kemerovsky District is in the northwest of the Kuznetsk Depression, which is the basin of the Tom River between the Salair Ridge to the west, and the Kuznetsk Alatau mountains to the east. The district surrounds the urban city district of Kemerovo, and features a stretch of the Tom River running southeast-to-northwest through the middle. The district covers a rich portion of the Kuznetsk Basin (the "Kuzbass" coal region).   The district is 150 km north of the Novokuznetsk. The terrain is a steeply sloping, hilly plain. Vegetation is northern steppe forest, with about 20% of the area steppe.

The district is about 100 km north-to-south, and 75 km west-to-east. Kemerovsky is about 200 km east of the city of Novosibirsk, and the M53 ("Novosibirsk - Krasnoyarsk") highway runs through the district.  Subdivisions of the district include 9 rural settlements. The climate of the district is humid continental (Koppen Dfb).

Kemorovsky District borders Krapivinsky District to the south, Izhmorsky District, Chebulinsky District, and Tisulsky District to the east, Topkinsky District to the west, and Yaysky District and Yashkinsky District to the north.

Administrative and municipal status
Within the framework of administrative divisions, Kemerovsky District is one of the nineteen in the oblast. The city of Kemerovo serves as its administrative center, despite being incorporated separately as a city under oblast jurisdiction—an administrative unit with the status equal to that of the districts.

As a municipal division, the district is incorporated as Kemerovsky Municipal District. Kemerovo City Under Oblast Jurisdiction is incorporated separately from the district as Kemerovsky Urban Okrug.

References

Sources

External links
 Kemerovsky District on OpenStreetMap.org
 Kemerovsky District on GoogleMaps

Districts of Kemerovo Oblast
